Hierodula gigliotosi is a species of praying mantis in the family Mantidae.

References

gigliotosi
Articles created by Qbugbot
Insects described in 1922